Matthew John Kenneth Te Pou (born Waiouru, on 27 August 1973) is a New Zealand former rugby union player. He played for Tonga. He is of Maori descent. His father, also called Matt Te Pou, was a coach of the Maori All Blacks in 2005.

Career
Te Pou first played for Tonga in 1998 against Australia, in Canberra on  22 September 1998. He was part of the 1999 Rugby World Cup 'Ikale Tahi squad coached by Polutele Tu'ihalamaka, playing two matches in the tournament against the New Zealand and Italy. His last cap for Tonga was against Fiji in Nuku'alofa, on 7 June 2002. He played the National Provincial Championship for Thames Valley, King Country, as well in the Currie Cup, playing for the Gauteng Falcons.

Notes

External links
Matt Te Pou international statistics
Matthew John Kenneth Te Pou at New Zealand Rugby History

1973 births
People from Waiouru
Living people
New Zealand Māori rugby union players
New Zealand expatriates in South Africa
New Zealand rugby union players
Tonga international rugby union players
Rugby union flankers